Armatobalanus nefrens is a species of barnacle in the family Archaeobalanidae. It is endemic to the United States, where it is found as far north as Monterey Bay. It lives embedded in the corals Stylaster californicus and Errinopora pourtalesii. It is listed as Data Deficient on the IUCN Red List.

References

Archaeobalanidae
Crustaceans of the United States
Crustaceans described in 1963
Taxonomy articles created by Polbot